Nebojša Stanojlović (born 2 April 1989) is a Serbian football forward.

References

External links
 
 Nebojša Stanojlović Stats at utakmica.rs

1989 births
Living people
Sportspeople from Šabac
Association football forwards
Serbian footballers
FK Srem Jakovo players
FK Novi Pazar players
FK Smederevo players
FK Metalac Gornji Milanovac players
FK Mladost Lučani players
FK Mačva Šabac players
Serbian SuperLiga players
FK Pobeda players